A. major may refer to:
 Ademosyne major, an extinct beetle species in the genus Ademosyne, the family Ademosynidae and the superorder Archostemata
 Allactaga major, the great jerboa, a rodent species found in Kazakhstan, Russia, Turkmenistan and Uzbekistan
 Ammosaurus major, an extinct herbivorous dinosaur from the Early Jurassic of New England, probably synonymous with Anchisaurus polyzelus
 Amphicyon major, an extinct carnivorous mammal species from the middle Oligocene and early Miocene found across Europe and in western Turkey
 Aphrastochthonius major, a pseudoscorpion species in the genus Aphrastochthonius and the family Chthoniidae
 Arachis major, a flowering plant species in the genus Arachis native to South America

See also
 Major (disambiguation)
 A major, a note